Geestland is a town in the district of Cuxhaven, in Lower Saxony, Germany. It was formed on 1 January 2015 by the merger of the former municipalities of Langen bei Bremerhaven, Bad Bederkesa, Drangstedt, Elmlohe, Flögeln, Köhlen, Kührstedt, Lintig and Ringstedt.

Twin towns – sister cities

Geestland is twinned with:
 Tozeur, Tunisia

References

 
Cuxhaven (district)
Populated places established in 2015